Pholidae is a family of marine ray-finned fishes, known as gunnels, in the scorpaeniform suborder Zoarcoidei. These are fishes of the littoral zone and are mainly found in North Pacific Ocean, with two species found in the North Atlantic Ocean and Arctic Ocean.

Taxonomy
Pholidae was first put forward as a family in 1893 by the American zoologist Theodore Gill. The 5th edition of Fishes of the World classifies this family within the suborder Zoarcoidei, within the order Scorpaeniformes. Other authorities classify this family in the infraorder Zoarcales wihin the suborder Cottoidei of the Perciformes because removing the Scorpaeniformes from the Perciformes renders that taxon non monophyletic.

Etymology and spelling
Pholidae is derived from the name of the type genus Pholis which is an Ancient Greek name for a fish that hides in a hole, the name dating at least as far in history as Aristotle.

The family has been spelled as Pholididae, and this is grammatically correct, but Article 29 of the International Code of Zoological Nomenclature permits the use of Pholidae.

Subfamilies and genera
The Pholidae is subdivided into two subfamilies, four genera with a total of 15 species:
 Subfamily Pholinae Gill, 1893
 Genus Pholis Scopoli, 1777
 Subfamily Apodichthyinae Hubbs, 1927
 Genus Apodichthys Girard, 1854
 Genus Rhodymenichthys Jordan & Evermann, 1896 
 Genus Ulvicola Gilbert & Starks, 1897

Characteristics
Pholidae, the gunnels, have elongate, compressed bodies which resemble that of blennies. There is a single continuous dorsal fin, which has a base that is roughly double the length to that of the anal fin, the dorsal fin extends from the head to the caudal fin. The dorsal fin contains between 73 and 100 stiff spines while the anal fin has between 1 and 3 spines and 32 to 53 soft rays. the nala fin and the dorsal fin are joined to the rounded caudal fin. Some species have no pectoral fins but where they are present they are very small. The pelvic fins are also small, if present, and very simple with a single spine and a single soft ray. There is a single pair of nostrils. The body is covered with very small, difficult to see, cycloid scales which are covered in mucus. the sensory canals on the head have pores which are open to the outside. The lateral line runs along the middle of the flanks and is made up of a row of superficial neuromasts. The teeth are small and conical. The gill membranes have a wide joining and they are separate from the isthmus. There are no ribs. They are camouflaged fishes with coloration which can be yellow and brown to red or green, frequently they are marked with spots, blotches, and bands.

Distribution, habitat and biology
Pholidae gunnels are predominantly found in the North Pacific Ocean off the western coasts of North America and the eastern coasts of Asia, except for two species in the genus Pholis which are found in the Arctic and North Atlantic Oceans. They are mostly found in rocky intertidal and nearby shallow waters below the tide line, particularly in areas of kelp and other seaweeds. They frequently hide under rocks and in rock pools in the intertidal zone. Their diet is made up of small crustaceans and molluscs.

References

 

 
Zoarcoidei
Taxa named by Theodore Gill